MS Pearl Seaways is a cruiseferry owned by DFDS Seaways and operated on their Copenhagen–Frederikshavn-Oslo service. She was built in 1989 by Wärtsilä Marine, Turku, for Rederi AB Slite as MS Athena for use in Viking Line traffic. Between 1993 and 2001, she sailed as MS Langkapuri Star Aquarius. From 2001 to 2011 she sailed as MS Pearl of Scandinavia.

Pearl Seaways has a sister ship, Star Pisces

History

Viking Line service

In the latter half of the 1980s owners of the rival shipping companies Viking Line and Silja Line competed heavily for dominance on routes connecting Finland to Sweden, with 11 new builds delivered between 1985 and 1991. At this time, there was also a strong belief in growing of the cruise passenger market.

In response to challenge from the other Viking Line partner SF Line and Silja's owners, Rederi AB Slite ordered two new builds from Wärtsilä Marine Perno shipyard. The first of these was to be called MS Athena, and she was planned to replace the aging  on the freight-dominant Naantali–Kapellskär service. The ship was designed by Per Dockson. The authorities of Kapellskär failed to modernise their harbour to accommodate such a large ship, and when delivered in April 1989 the ship (which at the time of delivery was the largest cruiseferry in the world) was set on cruise traffic between Stockholm and Mariehamn, replacing the aged MS Apollo III. Additional public spaces, such as an "amusement park" and a disco were built on her cardeck. Part of the cardeck was also used as a parking space for cruise passengers who came to Stockholm with their own cars.

Apart from a fire in one of the cabins in May 1989, the Athena's service with Viking Line proved to be uneventful. In spring 1993, she made a test cruise from Stockholm to Riga. Unfortunately at the same time her owners were experiencing notable financial difficulties and were forced to declare bankruptcy in April 1993. Athena continued serving with Viking Line until August of the same year, when she was laid up in Stockholm awaiting sale. DFDS and P&O Ferries were both interested in her, and it was believed that the latter would be her new owner. In the end Malaysia-based Star Cruises made a bid their competitors couldn't match.

Star Cruises service

In September 1993 Athena was renamed Star Aquarius, re-flagged into Panama and started her journey from the Baltic to Singapore. Between October and December she was rebuilt in Sembawang dock, Singapore, as a cruise ship. Her interior decorations were changed and her entire cardeck was altered into a huge casino. Her Viking Line-red hull was replaced with a dark blue one and the base of her funnel repainted blue, with a yellow star where Viking's logo had been. This readaptation of Viking Line's funnel colours remains Star Cruises' funnel colour scheme to this day. During the rebuilding her name was again changed, this time into Langkapuri Star Aquarius. The ship was designed by Per Dockson. In 1994 the Langkapuri Star Aquarius begun cruising from Singapore (in practice the ships's name was often displayed as Star Aquarius in promotional material).

In 1998 her port of departure was changed into Hong Kong, and around the same time she received Star Cruises' new white-hulled livery. The former carferry was never a particularly practical cruise ship however, and when Star Cruises started taking delivery of various newbuilds the Langkapuri Star Aquarius was placed for sale. Eventually she was sold to DFDS on 11 January 2001.

DFDS service

The ship arrived back in Europe in March 2001 under the temporary name MS Aquarius. Between April and June of the same year she was rebuilt back into a car-passenger ferry first at Blohm & Voss, Hamburg, and then at Ålborg where most of the alterations to her interior were carried out, any alterations to the vessel that were added by Star Cruises were removed. She received her new name MS Pearl of Scandinavia while at Hamburg. During the rebuilding rearsponsons were added to the ship for increased stability. Finally on 26 June she started on her first journey between Copenhagen, Helsingborg and Oslo. On 27 December 2001 the ship had a blackout in Oslofjord and was drifting for an hour before power could be re-established.

In January 2002 the ship was again rebuilt, this time at Copenhagen, and again in January 2005 at Öresundsvarvet, Landskrona, Sweden. In October 2006 DFDS decided to drop the stop at Helsingborg in order to save fuel and pilot expenses.

On 17 November 2010, a fire broke out in the car-deck of the ferry while en route from Oslo to Copenhagen. After a re-fit following the fire she was painted in DFDS new livery and renamed MS Pearl Seaways.

In an unusual tradition for a passenger ship, the Pearl Seaways hosts a traditional Danish Christmas lunch, and is open for homeless people.

In 2016, the ship hosted an e-Navigation conference onboard while in Copenhagen, Denmark, which included a speech by the International Maritime Organization Secretary-General Kitack Lim.

In 2018, an 11kV/2MW shorepower kit was added to Pearl Seaways at Lindø shipyard. After testing, Pearl Seaways started official shorepower operation in Oslo on 1 March 2019, for a potential 2.6 GWh consumption per year.

In the summer of 2020 and after a 46-year break Frederikshavn was introduced as a stop on the route in both directions.

See also
Largest ferries of Europe

References

External links

 DFDS Seaways MS Pearl of Scandinavia
 MS Athena at Fakta om Fartyg 

Ships built in Turku
Cruiseferries
Cruise ships
Ferries of Norway
Ferries of Denmark
1988 ships
Ship fires
DFDS
Merchant ships of Norway